= Sumi Madhok =

Professor of political theory and gender studies in the United Kingdom

- Sumi Madhok
- Occupation: Academic
- Title: Professor of Political Theory and Gender Studies
- Awards: Sussex International Theory Prize (2022)

Academic work
- Discipline: Political theory
- Sub-discipline: Feminist political theory, gender studies, human rights
- Institutions: London School of Economics and Political Science

Sumi Madhok is an Indian political theorist and academic. She is a Professor of Political Theory and Gender Studies at the London School of Economics and Political Science (LSE), where she has also served as Head of the Department of Gender Studies. Her research focuses on feminist political theory, human rights, social justice, gender and postcolonialism.

== Academic work ==
Madhok's research examines questions of women's rights, political agency and social justice, particularly in the context of South Asia. Her work brings together political theory and research on the experiences of marginalised communities.

Her first book, Rethinking Agency: Developmentalism, Gender and Rights, was published in 2013. It examines the relationship between gender, development and individual agency, drawing on research involving women in rural India.

In 2021, Cambridge University Press published her book Vernacular Rights Cultures: The Politics of Origins, Human Rights and Gendered Struggles for Justice. The book examines how marginalised communities in India and Pakistan understand and pursue rights and justice. It also questions the dominance of Western perspectives in discussions of human rights.

== Awards and recognition ==
In 2022, Madhok's book Vernacular Rights Cultures received the Sussex International Theory prize.

In November 2024, she delivered a British Academy lecture titled "Anti-Imperial Epistemic Justice and Rights Politics in Most of the World". The lecture examined human rights, colonialism and alternative approaches to understanding justice.
